Giorgio Lalle (born 4 March 1957) is a retired breaststroke swimmer from Italy, who represented his native country at the 1976 Summer Olympics in Montreal, Quebec, Canada. He claimed the gold medal a year earlier at the 1975 Mediterranean Games in the men's 100 m breaststroke event.

References
 

1957 births
Living people
Italian male breaststroke swimmers
Swimmers at the 1976 Summer Olympics
Olympic swimmers of Italy
European Aquatics Championships medalists in swimming
Mediterranean Games gold medalists for Italy
Swimmers at the 1975 Mediterranean Games
Universiade medalists in swimming
Mediterranean Games medalists in swimming
Universiade bronze medalists for Italy
Medalists at the 1977 Summer Universiade
20th-century Italian people